Oliver Marach and Philipp Oswald were the defending champions, but they chose to compete alongside different partners in Hamburg instead. 

Matteo Berrettini and Daniele Bracciali won the title, defeating Denys Molchanov and Igor Zelenay in the final, 7–6(7–2), 7–6(7–5).

Seeds

Draw

Draw

References
 Main Draw

Swiss Open Gstaad - Doubles
2018 Doubles